Jade is the eighth album by Corey Hart, released in 1998. Three singles were released from the album.

Track listing
All songs written by Corey Hart.

"Let It Fly" - 3:55
"Without You" - 2:49
"You & I" - 3:51
"Break the Chain" - 4:27
"Là-Bas (duet with Julie Masse)" - 4:32
"So Visible (Easy to Miss)" - 4:14
"Jade" - 4:18
"Reconcile" - 4:09
"Above the Trees" - 4:16
"Bittersweet" - 3:43
"Believing" - 3:51
"Everytime You Smile" - 3:43

Personnel 
 Corey Hart – lead vocals, keyboards (1, 3, 4, 7-10, 12), arrangements (1-4, 6-12), backing vocals (4), acoustic piano (8, 12)
 David "DibS" Shackney – keyboards (1, 2, 3), programming (1, 2, 3)
 Dave Katz – additional keyboards (2)
 Michel Corriveau – acoustic piano (2), Mellotron (4), Hammond B3 organ (6, 7, 11), keyboards (7), accordion (10), Wurlitzer electric piano (11)
 Erick Benzi – keyboards (4, 5, 12), programming (4), arrangements (5), additional keyboards (8), bass (12)
 Doug "DUG" McGuirk – guitar (1, 2, 3)
 Tim Pierce – guitar (1, 4, 11)
 Sylvain Quesnel – guitar (1, 2, 3, 8, 11)
 Danny Ranallo – guitar (1, 8, 10), dobro (12)
 Michael Thompson – guitar (1-4, 6-10), sitar (3), mandolin (6)
 Chris Goearicke – guitar (2)
 Gildas Arzel – guitar (5)
 Nicholas Mingot – guitar (5)
 Mike Brignardello – bass (1, 2, 7, 8, 9), handclaps (10)
 John Pierce – bass (3, 6, 7, 10)
 Mike Boyko – drums (1, 3)
 Kenny Aronoff – percussion (1, 2, 3, 6-11), drums (2, 6-11), handclaps (10)
 Bruce Brault – handclaps (10)
 Oswald "Ozzy Wiz" Bowe – handclaps (10)
 Julie Masse – backing vocals (1, 4, 8, 9, 10, 12), lead vocals (5)
 Dorian Sherwood – backing vocals (1-4, 6-11)

Production 
 Vito Luprano – executive producer 
 Corey Hart – producer (1-4, 6-12)
 Doug "DUG" McGuirk – additional producer (1, 2, 3), additional engineer (1, 3), mixing (1, 2, 3)
 David "DibS" Shackney – additional producer (1, 2, 3), additional engineer (1, 3), mixing (1, 2, 3)
 Erick Benzi – additional producer (4), producer (5)
 Humberto Gatica – additional producer (4), mixing (4, 8)
 Terry Manning – recording, mixing (6, 7, 9-12)
 Oswald "Ozzy Wiz" Bowe – recording assistant, mix assistant (6, 7, 9-12)
 Vlado Meller – mastering 
 Catherine McRae – art direction, design 
 Randee St. Nicholas – photography 
 Erika Gagnon – painting 
 Marc Lostracco – painting
 Bruce Brault – management

Studios
 Recorded at Compass Point Studios (Nassau, Bahamas); Cove City Sound Studios (Long Island, New York); Studio Mega (Paris, France); Studio Bateau-Lune (Sceaux, France).
 Mixed at Compass Point Studios, Cove City Sound Studios and Studio Mega.
 Mastered at Sony Music Studios (New York City, New York).

References

1998 albums
Corey Hart (singer) albums
Columbia Records albums